Istana Negara (meaning "State Palace" in Malay) may refer to:

 Istana Negara, Jakarta, Indonesia
 Istana Negara, Jalan Tuanku Abdul Halim, Kuala Lumpur, Malaysia - National Palace of Malaysia since 2011
 Istana Negara, Jalan Istana, Kuala Lumpur, Malaysia - Former National Palace of Malaysia, now the Royal Museum
 Istana Negara Singapura, the official residence and office of the President of Singapore.